Dean Turner (born 6 October 1959) is a former Australian rules footballer who played with Fitzroy and the West Coast Eagles in the Victorian/Australian Football League (VFL/AFL).

Turner came to East Perth from the Boyanup Capel Dardanup Football Club in rural Western Australia (now the Eaton Boomers). He made his Western Australian National Football League (WAFL) debut in 1978 and won the F. D. Book Medal as East Perth's 'Best and Fairest' player in 1981.

Fitzroy acquired his services in 1984 and he spent three seasons with the VFL club. He appeared in four finals and in 1986 had 361 disposals. A utility, he was often used on the wing.

He joined the inaugural squad of the West Coast Eagles in 1987 and played 17 games that year. He retired after playing in West Coast's preliminary final loss to Essendon in 1990. During this time he also appeared for East Perth and finished with 143 WAFL games.

References

1959 births
Australian rules footballers from Western Australia
East Perth Football Club players
Eaton Boomers Football Club players
Fitzroy Football Club players
Living people
People from the South West (Western Australia)
West Coast Eagles players